Melvin Eugene Payton (July 16, 1926 – May 12, 2001) was an American professional basketball player born in Martinsville, Indiana.  A 6'4" forward, Payton attended college at Tulane University. He played for four years for the Tulane Green Wave, averaging 11.8 points per game. Payton was selected in the second round (19th pick overall) of 1951 NBA draft by the Philadelphia Warriors. He played one season with the Warriors before being traded to the Indianapolis Olympians in exchange for Don Lofgran. Payton played 111 games in his two-year career, scoring 595 points, grabbing 396 rebounds, and playing 1,895 minutes.

References

1926 births
2001 deaths
American men's basketball players
Basketball players from Indiana
High school basketball coaches in Indiana
Indianapolis Olympians players
People from Martinsville, Indiana
Philadelphia Warriors draft picks
Philadelphia Warriors players
Small forwards
Tulane Green Wave men's basketball players